Dariusz Adam Wolski (born 7 May 1956 in Warsaw) is a Polish film and music video cinematographer. He is known for his work as the cinematographer on the Pirates of the Caribbean film series and on Alex Proyas' cult classics The Crow and Dark City. Many of his collaborations include working with film directors like Ridley Scott, Rob Marshall, Tony Scott, Gore Verbinski and Tim Burton. He has been a member of the American Society of Cinematographers since 1996 and a member of the Academy of Motion Picture Arts and Sciences since 2004. Wolski has worked on several music videos with artists such as Elton John, Eminem, David Bowie, Sting, Aerosmith, and Neil Young.

Personal life 
Wolski was born on May 7, 1956. He attended film school in Łódź, Poland and moved to the United States in 1979 at age 23. Soon after, he began working as a camera assistant on low-budget films in New York City and Los Angeles, which eventually led him to work as a cinematographer on films such as Pirates of the Caribbean, Prometheus, The Martian and others.

Filmography

Awards and nominations

External links

1956 births
Living people
Film people from Warsaw
Polish cinematographers
Polish emigrants to the United States